Nesam Pudhusu is a 1999 Indian Tamil-language romantic drama film, written and directed by Karthikvel. The film stars Ranjith and Priya Raman. It was released on 1 October 1999.

Plot

Cast 

 Ranjith as Ranjith
 Priya Raman as Vasanthi
 Senthil as Chithappu
 Vadivelu as Velu
 Sangili Murugan as Village President
 Ajay Rathnam as Vasanthi's cousin
 Sakthi Kumar as Suresh
 Bayilvan Ranganathan as Major Mayandi
 Kovai Sarala
 Ganthimathi
 Vaishali as Sumathi
 Premi as Social worker
 Kullamani
 Idichapuli Selvaraj
 Vellai Subbaiah as Iyer
Thideer Kannaiah
 Mannangatti Subramaniam
 K. K. Soundar
 Bonda Mani
 Kovai Senthil
 Chelladurai

Production 
The lead pair of the film, Ranjith and Priya Raman, fell in love and got married during the making of the film.

Soundtrack 
The soundtrack was composed by Bobby.

 "Meera Meera" – Hariharan
 "Poonguyilu Saththamthan" — S. Janaki
 "Kannorama Rosappoo" – P. Unnikrishnan
 "Orangattu Orangattu" – Mano
 "Oothikuda Machchan" – Vadivelu

Release and reception 
The film was released on 1 October 1999. K. N. Vijiyan of New Straits Times wrote "Nesam Pudusu is an unpretentious movie but directors Vel and Karthik manage to hold our interest". D. S. Ramanujam The Hindu wrote, "A SLIGHTLY different villagebased story where an young pair is forced to live as married couple following turn of events which generates interest right through in Sivasankaralaya’s “Nesam Puthusu”. The directors Vel-Karthik, who are making their debut, bring in the right changes with song and dances and comedy track." Sify wrote "This good story line suffers from bad acting of Ranjith while Priya does justice to her role".

References

External links 
 

1990s Tamil-language films
1999 directorial debut films
1999 films
1999 romantic drama films
Indian romantic drama films